Sae Nanjo is a Japanese freestyle wrestler. She won one of the bronze medals in the women's 57kg event at the 2021 World Wrestling Championships in Oslo, Norway. In 2017, she won the gold medal in the women's 55 kg event at the Asian Wrestling Championships held in New Delhi, India.

She won the gold medal in women's 57kg event at the 2022 U23 World Wrestling Championships held in Pontevedra, Spain.

References

External links 
 

Living people
Japanese female sport wrestlers
World Wrestling Championships medalists
1999 births
Asian Wrestling Championships medalists
21st-century Japanese women
Sportspeople from Hyōgo Prefecture